Round Grove Township is one of twelve townships in White County, Indiana, United States. As of the 2010 census, its population was 259 and it contained 103 housing units.

Round Grove Township was established in 1858. The township was named for a former round grove in the southern half of the township.

Geography

Unincorporated towns
 Round Grove at 
(This list is based on USGS data and may include former settlements.)

Adjacent townships
 West Point Township (north)
 Prairie Township (east)
 Wabash Township, Tippecanoe County (southeast)
 Shelby Township, Tippecanoe County (south)
 Bolivar Township, Benton County (southwest)
 Pine Township, Benton County (west)
 Gilboa Township, Benton County (northwest)

School districts
 Tri-County School Corporation

Political districts
 Indiana's 4th congressional district
 State House District 15
 State Senate District 07

References

Citations

Sources
 United States Census Bureau 2007 TIGER/Line Shapefiles
 United States Board on Geographic Names (GNIS)
 IndianaMap

External links

 Indiana Township Association
 United Township Association of Indiana

Townships in White County, Indiana
Townships in Indiana
1858 establishments in Indiana